Redstone is an unincorporated community in Sheridan County, Montana, United States. The community had a post office from 1903 until March 9, 2013; it still has its own ZIP code, 59257.

It is near the confluence of the Muddy River and Eagle Creek.

Demographics

References

Unincorporated communities in Sheridan County, Montana
Unincorporated communities in Montana